The Forge Shopping Centre (or Parkhead Forge) is in the East End of Glasgow, in Parkhead. The shopping centre bore the name from the former William Beardmore and Company steel works site, which had closed in 1983.

History

Construction 
The GEAR (Glasgow Eastern Area Renewal) scheme was founded in 1976, then Europe's largest urban regeneration project of its kind, to provide "core areas with development potential" in the east end of Glasgow. A new shopping centre was part of the plan, ideally to replace the then recently closed Parkhead Forge plant of the Beardmore's steel works. The shopping centre was going to contain a supermarket, a new multiplex cinema and at least 40 units. Work on the shopping centre began in 1986, and the building was opened to the public on 10 October 1988.  The main anchor tenant was a Gateway supermarket (at the time the largest in Scotland), but this changed over to Asda early in 1990 and has remained as such ever since.

The main entrances to the centre (on Duke Street and Gallowgate) feature distinctive glass pyramid designs.

Extension 
A second phase of the Forge Shopping Centre in the mid-1990s incorporated a new indoor market and bingo hall to the east of the initial site, and a retail park, operated by a separate company, to the west (the latter being built over part of the historic Camlachie neighbourhood). The retail park was expanded further in the early years of the 21st century to incorporate large branches of B&Q and Tesco.

Recently, the centre was extended to allow space for a new department store. Currently, money is being spent on remodelling the centre and modernising it. A new ceiling and tiles on floor can currently be seen, partly constructed near the Dunnes Stores/Primark exit of the centre.

Market Village closure  
On 15 November 2022 it was announced that the Forge Market Village would close with immediate effect due to the owners, Geraud UK Ltd, going into administration. This resulted in over 35 independent retailers including butchers, cafes, hairdressers and other small businesses being left without any premises. The market had been operating since 1989 when it was known as InShops. This did not affect The Forge Market, a separate market operating nearby from Duke Street.

Current stores 

The Forge has a range of shops including two anchor stores: Primark and Asda and a multiplex Cineworld cinema on site. A McDonald's drive-thru is erected in the vicinity of the car park.

References

External links

The Forge official site

Shopping centres in Glasgow
Shopping malls established in 1988
Cinemas in Glasgow
Parkhead
1988 establishments in Scotland